Charissa Panuve (born 19 November 1994) is a Tongan swimmer. She represented Tonga at the 2019 World Aquatics Championships held in Gwangju, South Korea. She competed in the women's 100 metre freestyle and women's 200 metre freestyle events. In both events she did not advance to compete in the semi-finals.

In 2018, she represented Tonga at the Commonwealth Games in Gold Coast, Australia. She also represented Tonga at the 2022 Commonwealth Games in Birmingham, England.

References 

Living people
1994 births
Place of birth missing (living people)
Tongan female swimmers
Tongan female freestyle swimmers
Commonwealth Games competitors for Tonga
Swimmers at the 2018 Commonwealth Games
Swimmers at the 2022 Commonwealth Games
21st-century Tongan women